The Grand Prix des Nations was an individual time trial (against the clock) for both professional and amateur racing cyclists. Held annually in Cannes, France, it was instituted in 1932 and often regarded as the unofficial time trial championship of the world and as a Classic cycle race. The race was the idea of a Parisian newspaper editor called Gaston Bénac. The beret-wearing sports editor was looking for a race to make a name for Paris-Soir, the biggest French evening paper before the war.

He and his colleague Albert Baker d'Isy had been inspired by the world road race championship in Copenhagen, Denmark, in 1931. That, unusually, had been run as a time trial, and the two were impressed and also, they said, aware that a time-trial cost less to organise than a conventional road race. Baker d'Isy decided the name Grand Prix des Nations.

There is a dispute over who devised the first route. The American-French writer René de Latour said in the UK magazine Sporting Cyclist that he did; Baker d'Isy says that he did. The route started near the Versailles château and ran round a triangle through Rambouillet, Maulette, Saint-Rémy-les-Chevreuse, Versailles and Boulogne to finish on the Vélodrome Buffalo where the founder of the Tour de France, Henri Desgrange, had become the world's first hour record holder in 1893. There were three hills, one in the first 100 km, plenty of cobbles, and the last 40 km went through the woods of the Vallée de Chevreuse, a popular area for bike riders. The distance was 142 km.

The introduction of an official time trial champion at the UCI Road World Championships in 1994 and an Olympic individual time trial championship (1996) reduced its importance. With the introduction of the UCI ProTour in 2005, the event was removed from the calendar.

History
Race distances have varied. Until 1955, it was approximately 140 km; six years later, the distance was 100 km; from 1965 onwards the distance rarely exceeded 90 km, with many events run of around 75 km. The events were in the Vallée de Chevreuse in the Paris area, then near Cannes on the French Riviera; for five years from 1993, it was held at the Madine Lake in the Meuse; from 1998, it has taken place in Seine-Maritime département, two circuits of 35 km around Dieppe.

The roll of honour includes cycling's greatest time trialists, but the event's history was dominated by two Frenchmen: Jacques Anquetil won nine times, Bernard Hinault five.

British amateur woman Beryl Burton competed in 1968, finishing only minutes behind her male rivals.

Winners (professionals)

|-style="color:gray"
|2000
|colspan="4"|Result Void

References

Cycle races in France
Defunct cycling races in France
Recurring sporting events established in 1932
1932 establishments in France
Recurring sporting events disestablished in 2004
UCI Road World Cup races
2004 disestablishments in France
Super Prestige Pernod races

pl:Grand Prix des Nations